Andre Alexander Shaquille Wisdom (born 9 May 1993) is an English professional footballer who plays as a right-back or centre-back.

Wisdom began his career at Bradford City before signing for Liverpool in 2008. He made his senior debut for the club in 2012 before enjoying loan spells with Derby County, West Bromwich Albion, Norwich City and Red Bull Salzburg. He left Liverpool in 2017 to spend four seasons with Derby County. Wisdom has also played for and captained the England youth teams at various levels, and was part of the squad which won the UEFA European Under-17 Championship in 2010.

Club career

Early career
Wisdom was born to Jamaican parents in Leeds, West Yorkshire, and grew up in the suburb of Chapeltown. He studied at Abbey Grange Church of England Academy. In his youth, he excelled in the junior teams of Bradford City and regularly played a year above his age group up to the under-15s. He signed for Liverpool as a fourteen-year-old in January 2008 for what his Bradford youth team manager Peter Horne implied was an unprecedented fee for a League Two youngster.

Liverpool

Wisdom progressed through the youth teams at Liverpool before featuring for the club's reserve team. In September 2010, manager Roy Hodgson called up Wisdom to his first team squad for the League Cup match versus League Two side Northampton Town. He was rewarded for his progress with an extension to his contract by newly appointed manager Kenny Dalglish in the summer of 2011.

2012–13
The appointment of Brendan Rodgers in June 2012 would be Wisdom's fourth manager during his time at Anfield and would present him with a fresh opportunity to stake a claim in the first team. In September, Wisdom would travel with several other Liverpool youngsters to Switzerland for their Europa League group tie versus Young Boys. He was named in the starting line-up and scored on his debut as Liverpool won 5–3. His impressive performance in Europe would lead to further opportunities for him in the first team in the following weeks; starting in the 2–1 victory over West Bromwich Albion in the League Cup on 26 September and making his Premier League debut from the start three days later in the 5–2 win away to Norwich City. He retained his place in the first-team for the following month, making his first appearance at Anfield in a goalless draw with Stoke City in doing so. He was handed his first taste of a Merseyside derby for the 2–2 draw at Everton on 28 October 2012.

On 9 January 2013, Wisdom signed a new long-term contract with Liverpool.

2013–14: Loan to Derby County
On 22 October 2013, Wisdom signed a season-long loan at Championship club Derby County in order to  progress his development. He went straight into Derby's back four and made his debut in the 1–1 home draw against Birmingham City on 26 October.  An ever-present in the team,
he left the club in May 2014 after playing at Wembley against QPR in the Championship play-off final, which Derby lost by the only goal of the game.

2014–15: Loan to West Bromwich Albion

On 22 July 2014, Wisdom joined West Bromwich Albion on a season-long loan and was assigned the number 2 shirt. Having played 22 games under manager Alan Irvine, after a 0–3 defeat to Tottenham Hotspur on 31 January 2015, he fell out of favour with new manager Tony Pulis and lost his starting place.

2015–16: Loan to Norwich City
Having signed a new four-year contract with Liverpool ahead of the 2015–16 season on 26 May 2015, Wisdom joined Premier League newcomers Norwich City on a season-long loan on 29 July 2015.

2016–17: Loan to Red Bull Salzburg
On 31 August 2016, he joined reigning Austrian Bundesliga champions Red Bull Salzburg on a season-long loan.

Derby County
On 3 July 2017, Wisdom joined Derby County on a permanent basis. He scored his first goal for Derby, and his first professional goal since his Liverpool debut in 2012, in a 4–2 FA Cup win over Northampton Town on 4 February 2020. He scored his first ever league goal on 16 February 2021 to secure Derby's last-minute win away to Wycombe Wanderers in the Championship. His contract expired at the end of the season, and although he trained with the financially struggling club ahead of the 2021–22 season, he did not re-sign.

International career

England under-16s
Wisdom was called up to the England Under-16 squad for the Victory Shield tournament in the autumn of 2008. He started in the away fixture to Wales in a 1–0 victory at Stebonheath Park on 31 October. He featured again in the tournament a month later as a substitute in the 2–0 victory over Scotland at Sincil Bank as England finished top of the group and took the 2008 Victory Shield title.

England under-17s
The following year, Wisdom was called up to John Peacock's England Under-17 squads for their 2010 UEFA European Under-17 Championship campaign. England breezed through the qualifying and elite rounds to qualify for the Championship in Liechtenstein. He was selected for the final squad along with fellow Liverpool teammate and captain Conor Coady. He was an ever-present as England maintained their 100% record through to the knock-out round with victories over Czech Republic, Greece and Turkey in the group stage. England defeated France 2–1 in the semi-final with both goals coming from Ipswich Town striker Connor Wickham as they booked their place in the final for the second time in four years. Wisdom started the final versus Spain and equalised for England on the half-an-hour mark with a header from a corner after initially going a goal down. Wickham put England ahead twelve-minutes later and the score remain unchanged as the Lions won the tournament for the first ever time.

Wisdom would be one of many of the side's youngsters that would provide hope for the nation's future with the senior side crashing out of the World Cup in South Africa four weeks later after a humiliating 4–1 defeat to rivals Germany in the last-sixteen.

England under-19s
After tournament success with the under-16s and 17s, Wisdom continued to progress through the national ranks and joined up with Noel Blake's Under-19 squad during the 2010–11 season. He made his debut versus Slovakia in October and went on to make ten appearances for the side over the following two years. He failed to add to his success at younger age groups after the side failed to qualify for the 2011 UEFA European Under-19 Championship tournament and Wisdom missed out on the final squad that reached the semi-finals of the 2012 tournament.

England under-21s
Wisdom was named in a 27-man England Under-21 squad by manager Stuart Pearce in September 2011 for the 2013 UEFA European Under-21 Championship qualification match versus Azerbaijan Under-21s and the friendly match versus Israel Under-21s. He was joined in the squad by fellow Reds Jonjo Shelvey, Jon Flanagan, Martin Kelly and Jordan Henderson and made his debut at right-back versus Israel in a 4–1 victory, despite failing to have featured for Liverpool at a senior level. He returned to the squad a year later for the crucial Play-off games versus Serbia but withdrew after sustaining a shoulder injury. Wisdom was appointed as captain of the England U21 side in 2013, however in his first game in the role, a qualifier against Finland, he was sent off the pitch with a straight red card after kicking an opponent intentionally. After the completion of a four-match suspension, Wisdom did not return to the squad.

Personal life
In June 2020, Wisdom was taken to hospital after being stabbed in an "unprovoked assault and robbery" while visiting relatives in Toxteth, Liverpool.

Career statistics

Honours
Red Bull Salzburg
Austrian Football Bundesliga: 2016–17
Austrian Cup: 2016–17

England U16
Victory Shield: 2008

England U17
UEFA European Under-17 Championship: 2010

Individual
UEFA European Under-17 Championship Team of the Tournament: 2010

References

External links

Profile at the Football Association website

1993 births
Living people
Footballers from Leeds
English footballers
England youth international footballers
England under-21 international footballers
Association football defenders
Bradford City A.F.C. players
Liverpool F.C. players
Derby County F.C. players
West Bromwich Albion F.C. players
Norwich City F.C. players
FC Red Bull Salzburg players
Premier League players
Austrian Football Bundesliga players
English Football League players
English expatriate footballers
Expatriate footballers in Austria
English expatriate sportspeople in Austria
Black British sportsmen
English people of Jamaican descent
English victims of crime
Stabbing survivors